The Hyderabad International Film Festival (HIFF) is a film festival in Hyderabad, India.

Festival
The first Hyderabad International Film Festival (HIFF) was held in Hyderabad, Andhra Pradesh, India in 2007.

The Hyderabad Film Club, A.P. Film Directors' Association and Films Anonymous organized HIFF as an extension of their activities.

The Second Hyderabad International Film Festival was held in 2008. It was organised by the Hyderabad Film Club and the Telugu Film Directors' Association at Prasads Multiplex, Hyderabad.

References

Film festivals in India
Festivals in Hyderabad, India
Tourist attractions in Hyderabad, India
Film festivals established in 2007
2007 establishments in Andhra Pradesh